The Passaguai Family Gets Rich (Italian: La Famiglia Passaguai fa fortuna) is a 1952 Italian comedy film directed by Aldo Fabrizi and starring Fabrizi, Erminio Macario, Ave Ninchi and Giovanna Ralli. It is the sequel to the hit 1951 film The Passaguai Family.

It was shot at the Ponti-De Laurentiis Studios in Rome and reunited many of the cast and crew from the previous film. It earned around 192 million lira at the domestic box office.

Synopsis 
At the end of the previous film the family patriarch Giuseppe lost his job. Now after a chance meeting with an old comrade he goes into business with him, each pretending to the other that they are a millionaire.

Cast
Aldo Fabrizi as  Giuseppe "Beppe" Passaguai
Erminio Macario as Giocondo Diotallevi
Ave Ninchi as Margherita, Giuseppe's wife
Luigi Pavese as the landlord
Virgilio Riento as Cosimo Pelacoccie
Marisa Merlini as the countess
Giovanna Ralli as  Marcella, Giuseppe's daughter
Carlo Delle Piane as "Pecorino", Giuseppe's son
Giancarlo Zarfati as  "Gnappetta", Giuseppe's son
Carlo Rizzo as Salomone
 Nino Pavese as The Buyer with a Beard and Glasses
 Alfredo Rizzo as The Journalist Onofrio
 Pietro De Vico as Un autista
 Lia Reiner as Vera 
 Tommaso Pallotta as 	Nando
 Lia Grani as The Maid at Gardini's

References

Bibliography
 Chiti, Roberto & Poppi, Roberto. Dizionario del cinema italiano: Dal 1945 al 1959. Gremese Editore, 1991.
 Gundle, Stephen. Fame Amid the Ruins: Italian Film Stardom in the Age of Neorealism. Berghahn Books, 2019.

External links
 
 The Passaguai Family Gets Rich at Variety Distribution

1952 films
1950s Italian-language films
Films set in Rome
Films directed by Aldo Fabrizi
Italian comedy films
1952 comedy films
Italian black-and-white films
1950s Italian films